Forever is the second studio album by English rock band Cranes. It was released on 26 April 1993 by Dedicated Records.

Critical reception

Melody Maker ranked Forever as the 24th best album of 1993.

In a retrospective review for AllMusic, Ned Raggett stated that Forever saw Cranes building on the mixture of "elegant restraint" and "brusque power" that characterised their 1991 debut album Wings of Joy. He noted that Forever "went to extremes in both directions – the quieter moments were even more hushed and shadowed, the louder points all that much more whip-snap cruel."

Track listing

Personnel
Credits are adapted from the album's liner notes.

Cranes
 Matt Cope – guitar
 Mark Francombe – guitar, keyboards
 Alison Shaw – vocals, bass
 Jim Shaw – drums, guitar, keyboards, bass

Additional musicians
 The Falseharmonics – strings on "Golden"
 Audrey Riley – string arrangements on "Golden"

Production
 Cranes – production, engineering
 Giles Hall – engineering
 Marcus Lindsay – engineering
 Andy Wilkinson – engineering

Design
 Miles Aldridge – photography
 John Barnbrook – Cranes logo design
 Albert Tupelo – design

Charts

References

External links
 

1993 albums
Cranes (band) albums
Dedicated Records albums